David Finley may refer to:

David E. Finley (1861–1917), United States Representative from South Carolina
David E. Finley Jr. (1890–1977), first director of the National Gallery of Art
David Crockett (wrestling) (born 1946), also known as Dave Finley, former professional wrestling announcer and executive

See also
David Finlay (disambiguation)